The risk difference (RD), excess risk, or attributable risk is the difference between the risk of an outcome in the exposed group and the unexposed group.

The inverse of the absolute risk reduction is the number needed to treat, and the inverse of the absolute risk increase is the number needed to harm.

Usage in reporting
It is recommended to use absolute measurements, such as risk difference, alongside the relative measurements, when presenting the results of randomized controlled trials. Their utility can be illustrated by the following example of a hypothetical drug which reduces the risk of colon cancer from 1 case in 5000 to 1 case in 10,000 over one year. The relative risk reduction is 0.5 (50%), while the absolute risk reduction is 0.0001 (0.01%). The absolute risk reduction reflects the low probability of getting colon cancer in the first place, while reporting only relative risk reduction, would run into risk of readers exaggerating the effectiveness of the drug.

Authors such as Ben Goldacre believe that the risk difference is best presented as a natural number - drug reduces 2 cases of colon cancer to 1 case if you treat 10,000 people. Natural numbers, which are used in the number needed to treat approach, are easily understood by non-experts.

Inference 

Risk difference can be estimated from a 2x2 contingency table:

The point estimate of the risk difference is

 

The sampling distribution of RD is approximately normal, with standard error

 

The  confidence interval for the RD is then

 

where  is the standard score for the chosen level of significance

Numerical examples

Risk reduction

Risk increase

See also
Population Impact Measures
Relative risk reduction

References

Epidemiology
Medical statistics